Acroceras macrum (Nile grass, Nyl grass) is a species of perennial grass native to Africa, which is often cultivated  extensively as pasture, silage, and hay. It is palatable and nutritious for animal feed. The roots are extended rhizomes and it produces spiked inflorescences 2–8 cm long. The bright green, lanceolate leaves are typically 8–20 cm long, with the whole plant being about 20–70 cm tall. It has been studied in breeding programs and it has been introduced to Australia and South America for cultivation.

Wild Nile grass grows well in flooded, moist, and humid conditions and does not do well in periods of drought. Thus, it is often found on streamsides, pond margins, and in swampy places. It is susceptible to leaf spot caused by Phyllosticta and smut caused by Ustilago syntherismae. It prefers acidic soils. It produces seeds but is usually propagated using cuttings of the rhizomes.

References

External links
Purdue University: Acroceras macrum
Tropical Forages: Acroceras macrum

Panicoideae
Flora of Africa
Flora of Egypt
Flora of Sudan
Forages